Akbarov is a Russian surname. Notable people with the surname include:

 Bobirjon Akbarov, Uzbek footballer
 Marat Akbarov (born 1961), Soviet Russian pair skater
 Rovshan Akbarov, Azerbaijani general and military leader

Russian-language surnames